The Mirna class (referred to as the Type 171 in some sources) is a class of eleven patrol boats built for the Yugoslav Navy ( - JRM) by the Tito's Kraljevica Shipyard. Intended as a replacement for the earlier Type 131 boats, the new class was completed during the early 1980s and commissioned in the JRM Maritime Border Brigade.

Following the outbreak of the Croatian War of Independence, two boats were damaged and subsequently captured by Croatian forces, while another two were captured in the Šibenik Shipyard during the Battle of the Barracks. All four were commissioned in the Croatian Navy and are in active service as of 2017. The remaining seven boats were relocated to Boka Kotorska where they became part of the Navy of FR Yugoslavia. All seven were decommissioned during the early 2000s: two were handed over to the Ministry of Interior and scrapped in 2012 after seeing little service, while the remaining five were sold off to civilian owners.

Boats

References 

Patrol boat classes
Ships of the Yugoslav Navy
Croatian Navy
Montenegrin Navy
Ships built in Yugoslavia